Real (stylized as REAL) is the third Korean-language extended play (EP) by South Korean singer-songwriter IU. It was released and distributed by LOEN Entertainment on December 9, 2010. The special edition of the album was sold out during pre-order, which revealed the high anticipation for the album. IU collaborated with some of the top vocalists and producers in South Korea such as Yoon Jong-shin, Kim Hyeong-seok, Lee Min-soo, Kim Eana, Shinsadong Tiger, and Choi Gap-won to work on the album. The album's success strengthened the singer's position as the "Nation's little sister" in her native country. In November 2019, Billboard magazine compiled a list of the 100 Greatest K-Pop Songs of the 2010s, with the single "Good Day" ranking at number one.

Background and release
Real consists of six songs and an instrumental of the title track, "Good Day". The album came in two different versions, normal and special edition. IU had worked with composers of hit songs such as "Abracadabra", "Nagging", and "Irreversible" to develop this album.

The album reflected the natural image of IU, as described by the album title. The title track is "Good Day" includes a musical combination of violin, wind instruments, guitar, and piano. It also displays her powerful vocals. The lyrics describe a story of a girl who doesn't have the courage to confess to her crush, the sweetness and tension of a first love.

IU also tried out a new music genre, electronic, in this album ("This Is Not What I Thought"). Other songs in this album includes "The Night of the First Breakup", a story about the day of a panicking girl who just broke up with her boyfriend; "Alone in the Room", lets you feel a mature side of IU and is filled with the emotions of an 18-year-old girl as IU co-wrote the lyrics to this song; "The Thing I Do Slowly", a ballad that describes a girl trying to forget her love after a breakup; and "Merry Christmas in Advance", a confession from IU to the fans, which was composed by Shinsadong Tiger. It features rapping from Thunder, who has been friends with IU since pre-debut, and the tune is a love song which brings everyone love during Christmas.

IU made her official comeback through KBS's Music Bank on December 10, 2010.

As of 2012, the album has sold more than 85,000 copies.

Track listing

Charts

Weekly charts

Monthly charts

Year-end charts

Awards and nominations

Annual music awards

Release history

See also
 List of best-selling singles in South Korea

Footnotes

References

2010 EPs
IU (singer) EPs
Korean-language EPs
Kakao M EPs